The ethmoidal veins are the venae comitantes of the ethmoidal arteries.

Veins of the head and neck